Gemeinde Bobrek-Karf, also referred to as simply Gemeinde Bobrek or Gemeinde Karf-Bobrek
(Polish: Gmina Bobrek-Karb, Gmina Bobrek, Gmina Karb-Bobrek), was a municipality in the District of Beuthen-Tarnowitz, part of the Silesian Province of Germany. It was created following the unification of the Bobrek and Karf municipalities in 1928.

History
The unification of the municipalities of Karf and Bobrek was proclaimed in 1928, the result was the creation of the Bobrek-Karf Municipality.

In 1932 a wooden evangelical church was built in Bobrek.

During the Second World War a volkssturm battalion var levied in Bobrek-Karf.

The municipality was abolished in 1945 following the Polish takeover of Bobrek and Karf, in its place a new municipality (Gmina Bobrek) was created (later renamed to "Gmina Bobrek-Karb").

Demographics
Population of the municipality (Gemeinde) of Bobrek-Karf:

Religious beliefs in Bobrek-Karf:

References

Sources
Deutsche Verwaltungsgeschichte Schlesien, Beuthen
Gemeindeverzeichnis Landkreis Beuthen-Tarnowitz [Stand: 1. 1. 1945]
Data

Bytom